In mathematics, the tautological bundle is a vector bundle occurring over a Grassmannian in a natural tautological way: for a Grassmannian of -dimensional subspaces of , given a point in the Grassmannian corresponding to a -dimensional vector subspace , the fiber over  is the subspace  itself. In the case of projective space the tautological bundle is known as the tautological line bundle.

The tautological bundle is also called the universal bundle since any vector bundle (over a compact space) is a pullback of the tautological bundle; this is to say a Grassmannian is a classifying space for vector bundles. Because of this, the tautological bundle is important in the study of characteristic classes.

Tautological bundles are constructed both in algebraic topology and in algebraic geometry. In algebraic geometry, the tautological line bundle (as invertible sheaf) is

the dual of the hyperplane bundle or Serre's twisting sheaf . The tautological line bundle and the hyperplane bundle are exactly the two generators of the Picard group of the projective space.

In Michael Atiyah's "K-theory", the tautological line bundle over a complex projective space is called the standard line bundle. The sphere bundle of the standard bundle is usually called the Hopf bundle. (cf. Bott generator.)

More generally, there are also tautological bundles on a projective bundle of a vector bundle as well as a Grassmann bundle.

The older term canonical bundle has dropped out of favour, on the grounds that canonical is heavily overloaded as it is, in mathematical terminology, and (worse) confusion with the canonical class in algebraic geometry could scarcely be avoided.

Intuitive definition 

Grassmannians by definition are the parameter spaces for linear subspaces, of a given dimension, in a given vector space . With this, we have the bundle.

The projective space case is included. By convention  may usefully carry the tautological bundle in the dual space sense. If  has dimension , the tautological line bundle is one tautological bundle, and the other, just described, is of rank .

Formal definition 

The total space of the bundle is the set of all pairs (V, v) consisting of a point V of the Grassmannian and a vector v in V; it is given the subspace topology of the Cartesian product  The projection map π is given by π(V, v) = V. If F is the pre-image of V under π, it is given a structure of a vector space by a(V, v) + b(V, w) = (V, av + bw). Finally, to see local triviality, given a point X in the Grassmannian, let U be the set of all V such that the orthogonal projection p onto X maps V isomorphically onto X, and then define

which is clearly a homeomorphism. Hence, the result is a vector bundle of rank n.

The above definition continues to make sense if we replace  with the complex field 

where on the left the bracket means homotopy class and on the right is the set of isomorphism classes of real vector bundles of rank n. The inverse map is given as follows: since X is compact, any vector bundle E is a subbundle of a trivial bundle:  for some k and so E determines a map 

unique up to homotopy.

Remark: In turn, one can define a tautological bundle as a universal bundle; suppose there is a natural bijection

for any paracompact space X. Since  is the direct limit of compact spaces, it is paracompact and so there is a unique vector bundle over  that corresponds to the identity map on  It is precisely the tautological bundle and, by restriction, one gets the tautological bundles over all

Hyperplane bundle 
The hyperplane bundle H on a real projective k-space is defined as follows. The rest is exactly like the tautological line bundle.

In other words, H is the dual bundle of the tautological line bundle.

In algebraic geometry, the hyperplane bundle is the line bundle (as invertible sheaf) corresponding to the hyperplane divisor

given as, say, x0 = 0, when xi are the homogeneous coordinates. This can be seen as follows. If D is a (Weil) divisor on  one defines the corresponding line bundle O(D) on X by 

where K is the field of rational functions on X. Taking D to be H, we have:

where x0 is, as usual, viewed as a global section of the twisting sheaf O(1). (In fact, the above isomorphism is part of the usual correspondence between Weil divisors and Cartier divisors.) Finally, the dual of the twisting sheaf corresponds to the tautological line bundle (see below).

Tautological line bundle in algebraic geometry

In algebraic geometry, this notion exists over any field k. The concrete definition is as follows. Note that we have:

where Spec is relative Spec. Now, put:

where I is the ideal sheaf generated by global sections . Thus, L is the tautological line bundle as defined before if k is the field of real or complex numbers.

In more concise terms, L is the blow-up of the origin of the affine space , where the locus x = 0 in L is the exceptional divisor. (cf. Hartshorne, Ch. I, the end of § 4.)

In general,  is the algebraic vector bundle corresponding to a locally free sheaf E of finite rank. Since we have the exact sequence:

the tautological line bundle L, as defined above, corresponds to the dual  of Serre's twisting sheaf. In practice both the notions (tautological line bundle and the dual of the twisting sheaf) are used interchangeably.

Over a field, its dual line bundle is the line bundle associated to the hyperplane divisor H, whose global sections are the linear forms. Its Chern class is −H. This is an example of  an anti-ample line bundle. Over  this is equivalent to saying that it is a negative line bundle, meaning that  minus its Chern class is the de Rham class of the standard Kähler form.

Facts

The tautological line bundle γ1, k is  locally trivial but not trivial, for k ≥ 1. This remains true over other fields.

In fact, it is straightforward to show that, for k = 1, the real tautological line bundle is none other than the well-known bundle whose total space is the Möbius strip. For a full proof of the above fact, see.

See also
 Hopf bundle
Stiefel-Whitney class
Euler sequence
Chern class (Chern classes of tautological bundles is the algebraically independent generators of the cohomology ring of the infinite Grassmannian.)
Borel's theorem
Thom space (Thom spaces of tautological bundles γn as n →∞ is called the Thom spectrum.)
Grassmann bundle

References

Sources

.
.

Vector bundles